An Object is the third studio album from the duo No Age and third to be released through Sub Pop. The band physically created, printed, packaged, and manufactured 10,000 units of the record themselves.

Track listing

Personnel
Randy Randall - Composer
Dean Spunt - Composer
Facundo Bermudez - Producer, Engineer
Pete Lyman - Mastering
Isaac Takeuchi - Cello

References

No Age albums
2013 albums
Sub Pop albums